Pedro Javier Godoy Agüero (born 28 June 1995) is a Paraguayan footballer who plays as a forward.

Club career
Born in Concepción, Paraguay, Godoy began his career with Atlético Tembetary, before moving to Spain in 2008 to sign for Espanyol. After his release in July 2012, he attracted offers from numerous Spanish sides, and was close to signing with Málaga, but ultimately decided to join Barcelona. While at Barcelona, he trained with the first team on numerous occasions.

His contract with Barcelona expired on 30 June 2014, and a month later he returned to Paraguay to sign for Olimpia. After two appearances for Olimpia, he was loaned to Rubio Ñu in 2015.

After leaving Olimpia, Godoy played for Tacuary FBC and Atlético Colegiales, and was playing at Nanawa in Concepción in 2019. He also featured for 29 de Setiembre in 2019.

By 2021, he was playing for 12 de Octubre.

International career
Godoy was called up to the Paraguay national under-20 football team in June 2014.

Style of play
Standing at 1.66 m, Godoy drew comparisons with Argentine Sergio Agüero for his explosiveness in tight spaces and shooting ability.

Career statistics

Club

Notes

References

1995 births
Living people
Paraguayan footballers
Paraguay youth international footballers
Association football forwards
Paraguayan Primera División players
Club Atlético Tembetary players
RCD Espanyol footballers
FC Barcelona players
Club Olimpia footballers
Club Rubio Ñu footballers
Atlético Colegiales players
Paraguayan expatriate footballers
Paraguayan expatriate sportspeople in Spain
Expatriate footballers in Spain